Oracle WebLogic Server is a Java EE application server currently developed by Oracle Corporation. Oracle acquired WebLogic Server when it purchased BEA Systems in 2008.

Application Server versions
 WebLogic Server 14c (14.1.1) - March 30, 2020 
 WebLogic Server 12cR2 (12.2.1.4) - September 27, 2019 
 WebLogic Server 12cR2 (12.2.1.3) - August 30, 2017 
 WebLogic Server 12cR2 (12.2.1.2) - October 19, 2016 
 WebLogic Server 12cR2 (12.2.1.1) - June 21, 2016 
 WebLogic Server 12cR2 (12.2.1.0) - October 23, 2015
 WebLogic Server 12cR1 (12.1.3) - June 26, 2014
 WebLogic Server 12cR1 (12.1.2) - July 11, 2013
 WebLogic Server 12cR1 (12.1.1) - Dec 1, 2011
 WebLogic Server 11gR1 (10.3.6) - February 26, 2012
 WebLogic Server 11gR1 (10.3.5) - May 16, 2011
 WebLogic Server 11gR1 (10.3.4) - January 15, 2011
 WebLogic Server 11gR1 (10.3.3) - April 2010
 WebLogic Server 11gR1 (10.3.2) - November 2009
 WebLogic Server 11gR1 (10.3.1) - July 2009
 WebLogic Server 10gR3 (10.3.0) - August 2008
 WebLogic Server 10.0 - March 2007
 WebLogic Server 9.2
 WebLogic Server 9.1
 WebLogic Server 9.0 - November 2006
 WebLogic Server 8.1 - July 2003
 WebLogic Server 7.0 - June 2002
 WebLogic Server 6.1
 WebLogic Server 6.0 - file date March 2001 on an old CD
 WebLogic Server 5.1 (code name: Denali) First version supporting hot deployment for applications (via command line)
 WebLogic Server 4.0 - May 1999
 WebLogic Tengah 3.1 - June 1998
 WebLogic Tengah 3.0.1 - March 1998
 WebLogic Tengah 3.0 - January 1998
 WebLogic Tengah - November 1997

Capabilities
Oracle WebLogic Server forms part of Oracle Fusion Middleware portfolio and supports Oracle, IBM Db2, Microsoft SQL Server, MySQL Enterprise and other JDBC-compliant databases. Oracle WebLogic Platform also includes:
 Formerly, JRockit, a custom JVM (discontinued with some components merged into HotSpot/OpenJDK following Sun acquisition)
 Portal that includes Commerce Server and Personalization Server
 WebLogic Integration
 WebLogic Workshop, an Eclipse IDE for Java, SOA and Rich Internet Applications

WebLogic Server includes .NET interoperability and supports the following native integration capabilities:
 CORBA connectivity
 COM+ Connectivity
 IBM WebSphere MQ connectivity
 Java EE Connector Architecture
 Native enterprise-grade JMS messaging
 WebLogic/Tuxedo Connector

Oracle WebLogic Server Process Edition also includes Business Process Management and Data Mapping functionality. WebLogic supports security policies managed by security administrators. The Oracle WebLogic Server Security Model includes:

 application business logic separated from security code
 complete scope of security coverage for all Java EE and non-Java EE components

Components
As of 2010, Oracle Corporation regards the following products as "core components" of Oracle WebLogic Server:
 Enterprise Grid Messaging
 JMS Messaging Standard
 JRockit
 Oracle Coherence, in-memory caching of frequently used data across multiple servers
 Oracle TopLink
 Oracle WebLogic Server Web Services
 Tuxedo

Supported open standards
 BPEL & BPEL-J
 ebXML
 JAAS
 Java EE 1.3, 1.4, 5, 6, 7
 JPA 1.0, 2.0, 2.1
 JMX and SNMP
 Native support for:
 SOAP
 UDDI
 WSDL
 WSRP
 WS-Security
 XSLT and XQuery

Standards support by version
The table below lists major standards supported by WebLogic Server product version.

WebLogic Server 10.3 (10.3.4 /PS3 onwards) supports some Java EE 6 libraries.

See also 

 List of application servers

References

Bibliography

External links
WebLogic Server at Oracle.com

WebLogic
Java enterprise platform
Oracle software
Service-oriented architecture-related products
WebLogic